Bashir or Basheer or the francicized Bachir or Bechir is a male given name. Derived from Arabic, it means "the one who brings good news". It is also a surname.

Bashir may refer to:

Mononym
Bashir I, Lebanese emir of the Shihab dynasty
Bashir Shihab II (1767–1850), Lebanese emir who ruled Lebanon
Bashir III, ruler of the Mount Lebanon Emirate (7th Emir, reigned 1840–1842)

Given name

Bachir
Bachir Gemayel or Bashīr al-Jimayyel (1947–1982), Lebanese military commander, politician and president-elect
Bachir Abdelouahab (1897–1978), Algerian politician and medical doctor
Bachir Ammoury (born 1983), American-born Lebanese basketball player 
Bachir Attar (born 1964), Moroccan American musician and leader of The Master Musicians of Jajouka led by Bachir Attar.
Bachir Bensaddek (born 1972), Canadian television director of Algerian Berber descent 
Bachir Boudjelid (born 1978), Algerian football player
Bachir Boumaaza (born 1980), mostly known by the online pseudonym Athene, a Belgian internet personality and Twitch.tv streamer
Bachir Douadi (born 1953), Algerian football player 
Bachir Moustafa Hammoud (1906–1945), a Lebanese philosopher, poet and Shī‘ah religious leader
Bachir Mahamat (born 1996), Chadian sprinter
Bachir Mané (born 1997), Senegalese football player
Bachir Mecheri (born 1964), Algerian football player
Bachir Qamari (1951–2021), Moroccan literary critic, novelist and playwright 
Bachir Sebaâ (born 1949), Algerian football player
Bachir Yellès (1921–2022), Algerian painter
 Bab Bachir (died 1254) was the spouse of last Abbasid caliph al-Musta'sim.

Basheer
 Basheer Matta, Pakistani politician

Bashir
 Bashir Abdi (born 1989), Somali-Belgian athlete 
 Bashir Ahmed, many persons with the name Bashir Ahmad and Bashir Ahmed 
 Bashir Ahmad (mixed martial artist) (born 1982), Pakistani-American professional mixed martial artist 
 Bashir Badr (born 1935), Indian poet of Urdu
 Bashir Saleh Bashir, former aide of former Libyan leader Muammar Gaddafi, head of the Libyan African Portfolio, a sovereign wealth fund that invested Libya's oil wealth mostly in sub-Saharan Africa, and served as an intermediary between Libya, Africa and France
 Bashir Yusuf Ibrahim (born 1961), Nigerian politician and businessman
 Bashir Isse, Somali banker and Governor of the Central Bank of Somalia
 Bashir Jehangiri (born 1937), Pakistani judge
 Bashir Levingston (born 1976), Canadian Football League player
 Bashir Maan (1926–2019), Pakistani-Scottish politician, businessman, judge, community worker and writer.
 Bashir Makhtal (born 1977), Canadian citizen held in an Ethiopian prison, where he is accused of terrorism and faces the death penalty
 Bashir Ahmed Qureshi (1959–2012), Sindhi nationalist who served as the leader of Jeay Sindh Qaumi
 Bashir Ali Mohammad (born 1947), Pakistani businessman
 Bashir Ramathan, Ugandan boxer
 Bashir Ramzy (born 1979), American long jumper 
 Bashir Safaroglu (1925–1969), Azerbaijani Soviet theater and film actor.
 Bashir Salahuddin (born 1976), American actor, writer and comedian
 Bashir Shah (born 1983), Pakistani-born Danish cricketer
 Bashir Tofa, Nigerian politician
 Bashir Varaev (born 1964), Chechen judoka 
 Haji Bashir Ismail Yusuf (1912–1984), Somali politician
 Bashir Yussuf (born c. 1905), Somali religious leader

Bechir
Bechir Hadidane (born 1984), Tunisian basketball player
Bechir Kiiari (born 1960), Tunisian judoka
Bechir Mardassi (born 1929), Tunisian cyclist
Bechir Mogaadi (born 1975), Tunisian football player 
Bechir Tekkari, Tunisian politician

Béchir
Béchir Bouazzat (1908–1944), French modern pentathlete of Tunisian descent

Middle name
Kausar Bashir Ahmed (1939–2006), Pakistani architect, town-planner and educationist
Khadra Bashir Ali, Somali politician
Souleymane Bachir Diagne (born 1955), Senegalese philosopher
Mirza Bashir Ahmad (1893–1963), an Ahmadiyya scholar and writer
Nadim Bachir Gemayel (born 1982), Lebanese politician and member of Parliament. Son of assassinated Lebanese president Bachir Gemayel
Aminu Bashir Wali (born 1941), Nigerian politician and Minister of Foreign Affairs

Surname

Bachir
Jamil Bachir or Bashir (1920–1977), Iraqi Assyrian musician and expert oud player
Oubi Buchraya Bachir (born 1970), Sahrawi ambassador
Salah Bachir (born 1955), Canadian patron of the arts, entrepreneur, philanthropist, magazine publisher of Lebanese descent
Yamina Bachir (born 1954), Algerian film director and screenwriter

Bashir 
 Aamir Bashir, Indian actor and film director
 Abdul Malik Abdul Bashir (born 1968), Singaporean association football referee
 Abu Bakar Bashir (born 1938), Indonesian Muslim cleric and leader of the Indonesian Mujahedeen Council
 Ahmad Bashir (1923–2004), Pakistani writer, journalist, intellectual and film director
 Ahmed Bashir (born 1995), Pakistani cricketer
 Ahmed Mohamed El-Bashir (born 1949), Sudanese football player
 Ala Bashir (born 1939), Iraqi painter, sculptor, plastic surgeon and former medical counselor to Saddam Hussein
 Amjad Bashir (born 1952) UK MEP
 Asabe Vilita Bashir (born 1965), Nigerian politician
 Atif Bashir (born 1985), Pakistani German football player
 Bashir Saleh Bashir, former aide of former Libyan leader Muammar Gaddafi, head of the Libyan African Portfolio, a sovereign wealth fund that invested Libya's oil wealth mostly in sub-Saharan Africa, and served as an intermediary between Libya, Africa and France
 Dara Bashir, Pakistani cricketer
 Farshad Bashir (born 1988), Dutch politician of Afghan descent
 Halima Bashir, Sudanese human rights activist
 Hassan Bashir (born 1987), Pakistani football player
 Javed Bashir (born 1973), Pakistani playback singer 
 Jonis Bashir (born 1960), Somali-Italian actor and musician
 Marie Bashir (born 1930), Governor of New South Wales
 Martin Bashir (born 1963), British journalist
 Max Basheer (born 1927), former administrator with the South Australian National Football League
 Mowaia Bashir (born 1986), Sudanese football player 
 Mohammad Bashir (1935–2001), Pakistani wrestler
 Munir Bashir (1930–1997), Iraqi oud player
 Nas Bashir (born 1969), English football player
 Omar Bashir (musician) , Iraqi-Hungarian musician and oud player, son of Munir Bashir and nephew of Jamil Bashir
 Omar al-Bashir (born 1944), President of Sudan and Sudanese army field marshal
 Palwasha Bashir (born 1987), Pakistani badminton player 
 Ruzwana Bashir (born 1983), British businesswoman & activist
 Salman Bashir (born 1952), Pakistani diplomat
 Shahzad Bashir, Pakistani cricketer
 Shahid Bashir, Pakistan Army engineer and aviator facing court martial
 Tahseen Bashir, (1925–2002), Egyptian diplomat

Basheer
 Thalekunnil Basheer (born 1945), politician from Kerala state, India
 Vaikom Muhammad Basheer (1908–1994), Indian writer

Bechir
Azouz Bechir (born 1935), Tunisian boxer
Mohamed Bechir-Sow (1907–1976), Chadian politician 
Mohamed Salem Ould Béchir, Mauritanian politician and Prime Minister
Sayed Ali Bechir (born 1982), Qatari football player of Mauritanian descent

Béchir
Gabriel Béchir (1927–2001), French set decorator

Others
 Bichir family, a Mexican acting family of Lebanese descent

Fictional characters
 The title character of Bashir Lazhar, a one-character play by Évelyne de la Chenelière
 Julian Bashir, the Chief Medical Officer in the television series Star Trek: Deep Space Nine.
 Ali Bashir, a minor character mentioned in the Harry Potter and the Goblet of Fire book by J.K. Rowling

Places
 Bashir, Iran, a village in East Azerbaijan Province
 Bashir, Iraq, a village south of Kirkuk
 Béchir, a village in Algeria
 Beni Bechir, a town and commune, Algeria
 Sidi Bashir Mosque, former mosque in the city of Ahmedabad, Gujarat, India
 Stade El Bachir, Mohammédia, Morocco

See also
Al Bashir, Arabic Christian magazine in Lebanon
Bishara, also Bechara, Béchara and Beshara

Arabic masculine given names
Arabic-language surnames